Sunay Erdem (born 17 March 1971) is a Turkish landscape architect (by degree) and self-taught architect. He is one of Turkey's most prolific and best Landscape architects of his generation. Sunay Erdem founded Erdem Architects with his brother, Günay Erdem, in 1998.

Sunay Erdem designed many urban design projects in more than 40 different countries. Erdem has been using free-hand sketching method since 1992 and he has more than 700 free-hand perspectives. His water colored sketch won the first prize in 2013 Sketch Showdown Competition, Mixed Media which was organized by Philadelphia Center for Architecture. He won Turkish National Architecture Award in the category Presentation of Ideas (2010). Sunay Erdem also won Turkish National Landscape Architecture Awards in 2009, 2010 and 2013 which were given by Chamber of Landscape Architects in Turkey. One of the important projects developed by Sunay Erdem is the wall project for the US-Mexico border.

Awards 
 Recognition Awards
 Turkish National Landscape Architecture Awards (2009, 2010 and 2013) which were given by Chamber of Landscape Architects in Turkey
 2010 Turkish National Architecture Awards and Exhibition/Category: Presentation of Ideas
 Çanakkale 18 Mart University,Success Award, Turkey, 2011
 Landscape Architecture 4 Congress, Profession Contribution Award, Turkey, 2010
 Landscape Architecture 4 Congress, International Success Award, Turkey, 2010
 TSMD Success Award, Turkey, 2010
 Chamber Of Landscape Architects, Success Awards, Turkey, 2008

 Awards in International Competitions
 La Spezia Arsenale 2062 Open Competition, Italy, Winner, 2014
 Regional Center for Educational Quality and Excellence Competition, Jubail, Saudi Arabia, 3rd Award, 2014
 ifac2013 International Festival of Art & Construction, Sunshade Competition, Spain, 1st Prize, 2013
  Actıvate! Desıgn Competition to Redefine Public Space in Chicago, USA Honorable Mention, 2013
 Sketch Showdown Competition, Mixed Media, Philadelphia, USA, Winner, 2013
  Home For Humanity Contest, San Francisco, USA, Winner, 2012
 LifeEdited Apartment #2Challenge Competition, New York, USA, Winner, 2012
 Recconect Riverton Pedestrian Bridge, Canada, Winner, 2011
 Vancouver Viaducts & eastern core, re:CONNECT An Open Ideas Competition, Vancouver, Canada, Winner, 2011
 The Old Harbour Along With Örfirisey in Reykjavik International Competition, Reykjavik, Iceland, Winner, 2009

 Awards in National Competitions
 Elazig Education Campus, National Competition, Mention, Turkey, 2013
 Smart Sings Competition, Mention Award, Turkey, 2011
 Zonguldak Lavuar Conservation Area And The Surrounding Urban Design Competition, Purchasing, Turkey, 2010
 Memorial For The Sarikamis Operation National Architectural Competition, 3rd Award, Turkey, 2008
 Adana Ziyapasa District Urban Design Competition, Purchasing, Turkey, 2008
 Maltepe Regional Park Project Competition, 3rd Award, Turkey, 2007
 Diyarbakir Valley Landscape Planning And Urban Design Competition, 2nd Award, Turkey,  2007
 Teos Marina, 1st Project, Turkey, 2006
 Çeşme Marina, 1st Project, Turkey, 2006
 Kahramanmaras Town Hall Competition, 1st Purchasing, Turkey, 2006
 Balikesir Çamlik Park National Architectural Competition, Purchasing, Turkey, 2006
 Bursa Terminal Square National Architectural Competition, Purchasing, Turkey, 2006
 Beylikduzu Cumhuriyet Street Design Architectural Competition, Mention, Turkey,  2006
 Bursa Kaplikaya Valley Landscape Design Competition, Purchasing, Turkey, 2006
 Uzundere Rekreation Valley Landscape Design Competition, 5th Mention, Turkey, 2006
 Izmit Historical Centre Urban Renewal Design Competition, 1st Mention, Turkey, 2005
 Van Besyol Time Square Design Competition, 3rd Award, Turkey, 2005
 Trabzon Kalkinma Downtown Landscape Design Project, Purchasing, Turkey,  2005
 Gaziosmanpasa City Hall And Environmental Design Competition, 2nd Award, Turkey, 2004
  ‘Former Fiume Veneto Cotton Mill Area’ International Competition, 9th Position, Turkey, 2004
 Izmit Basiskele Environmental Design Competition, 1st Award, Turkey, 2003
 Pananos Beach Landscape Design Competition, Purchasing, Turkey, 2003
 Ottoman Empire Memorial Park Competition, Purchasing, Turkey, 2002
 Damlatas Cave Restoration And Atatürk Park Competition, 1st Award, Turkey, 1999

Selected projects
Esertepe Park  (Ankara, 2014)

References

External links 

 Official web site
 Erdem Architects official Facebook page (updated daily)
 Sunay Erdem-Arkitera
 Turkish architects entrusted the future of New York
 Architects Of Future
 Turkish architects design peace islands to replace La Spezia war arsenal
 Erdem Architects Gets First Prize in La Spezia Arsenale 2062 Competition
 Identify a Public Space
 Turkish Architect Sunay Erdem was awarded the Freedom Park Award

1971 births
Living people
Turkish architects
Turkish landscape architects
People from Shumen
Bulgarian Turks in Turkey